Mopan (or Mopan Maya) is a language that belongs to the Yucatecan branch of the Mayan languages. It is spoken by the Mopan people who live in the Petén Department of Guatemala and in the Maya Mountains region of Belize. There are between three and four thousand Mopan speakers in Guatemala and six to eight thousand in Belize.

The other Yucatecan languages are Yucatec, Lacandon, and Itzaʼ. Mopan began to diverge from the other Yucatecan languages at least one thousand years ago.

Distribution
Towns where Mopan is prominently spoken include San Luis, Poptún, Melchor de Mencos, and Dolores in Guatemala, as well as San Antonio in the Toledo District of Belize.

Grammar

Word order
The word order in Mopan is verb-object-subject (VOS), although subject-verb-object (SVO) is also common.

Noun classifiers
Mopan has two noun classifiers that are used to indicate gender. However, use of these classifiers is not typical of grammatical gender. The two classifiers are ix (feminine) and aj (masculine), for example, aj much, meaning "toad (masculine)". Use of these gender markers is atypical in several respects:
 They are not used for most nouns.
 Gender is marked only in the noun and does not require agreement elsewhere in the sentence.
 Gender marking can sometimes be omitted.
Although the gender markers normally match the natural gender of the referent when denoting people, this is not always the case for non-human referents. For example, "parrot" (ix tʼutʼ) is typically feminine regardless of the sex of the animal.

Numerals and numeral classifiers
Numerals in Mopan always include a numeral classifier which is added as a suffix. These classifiers indicate qualities about the referent. For example, round objects are indicated by the suffix -kuul, while long, thin objects are indicated by the suffix -tzʼiit. The most commonly used numeral classifiers are -pʼeel, for inanimate objects, and -tuul, for people and animals. In all, there are over 70 numeral classifiers used in Mopan Maya.

Phonology

Consonants

The following are the consonant sounds used by the Mopan Maya language (written with the International Phonetic Alphabet):

In addition, some sources list  (the velar nasal) as a consonant sound in Mopan Maya.

Vowels
The following are the vowel sounds of the Mopan Maya language:

Orthography
Since the colonial period, Mopan Maya has been written with the Latin script. Historically, a wide range of orthographies have been used to represent the language, although recently, the orthography has been standardized by the Guatemalan Academy of Mayan Languages (ALMG). The following table shows some of the orthographies that have been used to represent Mopan Maya:

Notes

References

External links
 Mopán Maya New Testament 2004 Edition (archived)

Agglutinative languages
Mayan languages
Indigenous languages of Central America
Mesoamerican languages
Languages of Belize
Toledo District
Languages of Guatemala
Petén Department